Adi (עדִי) or Ady is a
Hebrew-language given name, which means "jewel" or "ornament". It also means "my witness" in Hebrew. 

In Arabic, the title Adi (عَدي) was common in military distinctions in the early Islamic era. It means "the one who charges" in battle or sports. 

Adi or Aadi (आदि) is also a male Tamil or Sanskrit given name, which means "first"and "superior". 

It can also be a short form of Adrian, Aditya, Adriana and Adolf, and is also used as a surname.

First name 
Adi Adilović (born 1983), Bosnian football goalkeeper
Adi Alsaid (born 1987), Mexican author
Adi Altschuler (born 1986), Israeli educator and entrepreneur
Adi Ashkenazi (born 1975), Israeli actress
Adi Barkan, Israeli model agent and activist
Adi Ben-Israel (born 1933), American mathematician, engineer, and professor
Adi Unaisi Biau, Fijian rugby union player
Adi Bichman (born 1983), Israeli swimmer
Adi Bielski (born 1982), Israeli actress
Adi Bitar (1924–1973), Palestinian judge
Adi Bolakoro (born 1985), Fijian netball goalkeeper
Adi Braun (born 1962), Canadian jazz and cabaret vocalist and composer
Adi Bulsara (born 1951), Indian scientist
Adi Carauleanu (born 1957), Romanian actor
 Adi Da (1939–2008), American spiritual teacher, writer, and artist, born as Franklin Albert Jones
 Adi Darma (1960–2020), Indonesian politician 
 Adolf Dassler, German founder of Adidas
 Adi Dick (born 1978), New Zealand singer-songwriter and producer
 Adilson dos Santos, Brazilian footballer
 Adi Ezroni (born 1978), Israeli actress, model, producer, and television host
Adi Funk (1951–2010), Austrian motorcycle speedway rider 
Adi Gafni, Israeli sprint canoer 
Adi Gevins, American radio documentarian, producer, educator, archivist, and creative consultant 
Adi Godrej (born 1942), Indian industrialist
Adi Gordon (born 1966), Israeli professional basketball player
Adi Granov (born 1978), Bosnian comic artist
Adi Hasak (born 1964), American writer
Adi Havewala (1917–2001), Indian cyclist
Adi Himelbloy (born 1984), Israeli actress
Adi Hütter (born 1970), Austrian football player
Adi Ignatius (born 1959), American journalist
Adi Irani, Indian actor
Adi Eko Jayanto (born 1994), Indonesian footballer
Adi Kanga (1923–2013), Indian civil engineer, writer, and city planner
Adi Asya Katz (born 2004), Israeli gymnast
Adi Keissar (born 1980), Israeli poet
Adi Koll (born 1976), Israeli politician
Adi Konstantinos (born 1994), Israeli footballer
Adi Kurdi (1948–2020), Indonesian actor
Adi Lev (1953–2006), Israeli actress
Adi Lukovac (1970–2006), Bosnian musician
Adi Malla (694–710 CE.), founder of the Mallabhum
Adi Pherozeshah Marzban (1914–1987), Indian playwright, actor, director, and broadcaster
Adi Mehremić (born 1992), Bosnian footballer
Adi Meyerson, Israeli jazz bassist
Adi Mešetović (born 1997), Bosnian swimmer
 Sheikh Adi ibn Musafir (1072-1078–1162), Kurdish sheikh
 Adi Nalić (born 1997), Bosnian footballer
Adi Nes (born 1966), Israeli photographer
Adi Nimni (born 1991), Israeli footballer
Adi Nugroho (born 1992), Indonesian footballer
Adi Ophir (born 1951), Israeli philosopher
Adi Parwa (born 1994), Indonesian footballer
Adi Pinter (1948–2016), Austrian footballer manager
Adi Popovici (born 1969), Romanian handball player
 Adi Prag (born 1957), Israeli swimmer
 Adi Pratama (born 1990), Indonesian-Austrian badminton player
Adi Ran (born 1961), Israeli singer
Adi Rocha (born 1985), Brazilian footballer
Adi Roche (born 1955), Irish politician and activist
Adi Said (born 1990), Bruneian footballer
Adi Sasono (1943–2016), Indonesian politician
Adi Satryo (born 2001), Indonesian football goalkeeper
Adi Schwartz, Israeli journalist and academic
Adi M. Sethna (died 2006), Indian Army General
Adi Shamir (born 1952), Israeli cryptographer
Adi Shankar (born 1985), Indian-American film producer, screenwriter, film director, television program creator, television showrunner, and actor
Adi Shankara (788–820), Indian philosopher
Adi Shilon (born 1987), Israeli radio presenter, actress, and television host
Adi Smolar (born 1959), Slovenian singer-songwriter
Adi Andojo Soetjipto (1932–2022), Indonesian jurist and lecturer
Adi Soffer (born 1987), Israeli footballer
Adi Sorek (born 1970), Israeli writer and editor
Adi Stein (born 1986), Israeli footballer and coach
Adi Stenroth (1896–1931), Finnish officer
Adi Stern (born 1966), Israeli graphic designer and type designer
Adi Sulistya (born 1991), Indonesian footballer
Adi Talmor (1953–2011), Israeli journalist
Adi Taviner (born 1990), Welsh rugby union player
Adi Tuwai (born 1998), Fijian football goalkeeper
Adi Ulmansky, Israeli rapper and music producer
Adi Utarini (born 1965), Indonesian public health researcher
Adi Viveash (born 1969), English footballer
Adi Yussuf (born 1992), Tanzanian footballer

Surname 
 Fanendo Adi, Nigerian footballer
 Sailom Adi, Thai

See also 
 Adi (disambiguation)

References

Hebrew-language given names
Indian masculine given names